Andreas Alamommo (born 23 December 1998) is a Finnish ski jumper. He competed in two events at the 2018 Winter Olympics.

References

External links

1998 births
Living people
Finnish male ski jumpers
Olympic ski jumpers of Finland
Ski jumpers at the 2018 Winter Olympics
Ski jumpers at the 2016 Winter Youth Olympics
21st-century Finnish people